Vismia baccifera is a tropical plant used by indigenous peoples in South America, in Colombian Amazon as well as Brazil, infused as traditional medicine.  It has been demonstrated to have great antitumor capability in kidney and liver by inducing massive oxidative stress in cancer cells, but not healthy cells, leading to rapid death of cancer cells. One of the phytochemicals it contains is lichexanthone.

References

 
baccifera
Taxa named by Carl Linnaeus